Susan Badr (nicknamed: The Nefertiti of Egyptian Cinema) (born September 25, 1959) is an Egyptian actress of film, stage and television. She received the Best Actress Award at the 34th Cairo International Film Festival. She played the role of Mishaal bint Fahd bin Mohammed Al Saud, the Saudi princess who was executed for adultery along with her lover, in the 1980 movie, Death of a Princess.

References

1957 births
Living people
Egyptian film actresses
Egyptian television actresses
Egyptian stage actresses